Valarie Lawson (born August 14, 1966) is an American politician and a Democratic member of the Rhode Island Senate and Deputy Senate Majority Leader representing District 14 since January 2019.

Lawson is also an educator at East Providence High School where she teaches U.S History and civics. She is also the Vice-President of the National Education Association of Rhode Island, she will become the president of this teachers union in 2023.

References 

1966 births
Living people
Democratic Party Rhode Island state senators
Women state legislators in Rhode Island
21st-century American politicians
21st-century American women politicians